Mariella Mehr (26 December 1947 – 5 September 2022) was a Swiss novelist, playwright, and poet. She was born a member of the itinerant Yeniche people, but separated from her family by the program Kinder der Landstrasse, and raised in institutions and by foster parents. Her first novel, Steinzeit, with autobiographical elements, appeared in 1981. She championed the causes of outsiders and oppressed minorities. She received various awards and an honorary doctorate from the University of Basel for her work.

Life 
Mehr was born on 26 December 1947 (or 27 December 1947) in Zürich a member of the itinerant Yeniche people. She was affected by the program Kinder der Landstrasse, an organisation trying to assimilate children by separating them from their families traveling the country roads.
 Mehr was taken away from her mother at a young age and lived in orphanages and with foster parents. She was moved between 16 orphanages and three reformatories as a child, attending three schools.  She made money as a factory worker. She became pregnant at age 18. After giving birth, her son was taken away. She was held at Hindelbank women's prison for 19 months and forcibly sterilised.

From 1974, Mehr wrote several articles, criticising the racism of Kinder der Landstrasse. She published her first literary work in 1975. Her first novel, Steinzeit (Stone Age), with autobiographical elements, appeared in 1981. Returning topics of her books are the causes of outsiders and oppressed minorities.

The title of her 1986 play Akte M. Xenos ill.* 1947 – Akte C. Xenos ill.* 1966 is the title of her dossier at Kinder der Landstrasse. It premiered at the Theater 1230 in Berne in 1986. Strong reactions were documented in its 1987 book publication as a documentary, Kinder der Landstrasse. Ein Hilfswerk, ein Theater und die Folgen (Children of the Country Road: A Charity, a Theatre and the Consequences). Her drama Silvia Z. was motivated by the 1980 youth riots in Zürich. Another 1986 drama, Anni B., is focused on a woman who fought as a member of the International Brigades in Spain and was placed in a mental institution when she returned to Switzerland.

Mehr lived in Tuscany since 1996. In 2000, she resigned from the authors' club Gruppe Olten, because the group removed the goal of realising a democratic socialist society from its mission statement. She was a founding member of the International Romani Writers' Association (IRWA) in 2002, and served as its vice president for some time.

She returned to Switzerland in 2015, settling in Zürich. She died in the Entlisberg nursing home in Zürich on 5 September 2022 at age 74.

Bibliography

Books 
Mehr's books include:

Stage works 
Mehr wrote three plays:

 Kinder der Landstrasse, drama, 1986
 Silvia Z. Ein Requiem., drama, 1986
 Anni B. oder Die fünf Gesänge der Not, drama, 1989

Awards 
Mehr was awarded the literary prize of the Kanton Zürich,  and the literary prize of Berne in both 1983 and 1987. She was awarded the prize of the Swiss Schillerstiftung in 1996.

Mehr's literary and social work was recognized in 1998 with an honorary doctorate from the University of Basel. In 2012, she was the first recipient of the ProLitteris award for a literary life's work.

References

Further reading 
 : Mariella Mehr. In: Schweizer Schriftsteller persönlich, pp. 222–237; 260. Huber, Frauenfeld 1983.
 Bernhard C. Schär: Nackte Ohnmacht, verletzte Körper und unverhüllte Kritik: Mariella Mehr. In: Bern 68. Lokalgeschichte eines globalen Aufbruchs – Ereignisse und Erinnerungen, pp. 192–196. Hier + jetzt, Zürich 2008, ISBN 978-3-03919-078-2.

1947 births
2022 deaths
European democratic socialists
Writers from Zürich
Yenish people
Swiss expatriates in Italy
Swiss women novelists
Swiss socialists
20th-century Swiss novelists
21st-century Swiss novelists
21st-century Swiss women writers
20th-century Swiss women writers